"The Groover" is a 1973 single by the British glam rock band T. Rex. Neither the track nor its B-side are taken from an album. However, they are often added as bonus material on re-releases of the 1973 album Tanx or the 1974 album, Zinc Alloy and the Hidden Riders of Tomorrow.

The single was in the UK Singles Chart for a total of nine weeks, peaking at No. 4, making it the last T. Rex song to enter the top ten during Marc Bolan's lifetime (or indeed since).

Cash Box said that with this song "a remarkable dance item that should drive [T. Rex's] huge following absolutely wild."

Personnel

Marc Bolan – lead vocals, guitar, backing vocals
Mickey Finn – congas
Steve Currie – bass guitar
Bill Legend – drums
Marc Bolan and Tony Visconti - backing vocals
Tony Visconti – producer

References

1973 singles
T. Rex (band) songs
Songs written by Marc Bolan
Song recordings produced by Tony Visconti
EMI Records singles
1973 songs